Mindarie may refer to:
 Mindarie, South Australia
 Mindarie, Western Australia